The 22655 / 22656 Thiruvananthapuram Central–Hazrat Nizamuddin Superfast Express is a Express Express train belonging to Indian Railways – Southern Railway zone that runs between  and  in India. It was announced  in 2014–15 Railway budget.

It operates as train number 22655 from Thiruvananthapuram Central to Hazrat Nizamuddin and as train number 22656 in the reverse direction, serving the states of Kerala, Karnataka, Goa, Maharashtra, Gujarat, Madhya Pradesh, Rajasthan, Uttar Pradesh, Haryana & Delhi.

Coaches

The 22655 / 56 Thiruvananthapuram Central–Hazrat Nizamuddin Superfast Express has one First AC cum AC 2 tier, one AC 2 tier, two AC 3 tier, eight Sleeper class, six General Unreserved & two SLR (Seating cum Luggage Rake) coaches. It does not carry a pantry car.

As is customary with most train services in India, coach composition may be amended at the discretion of Indian Railways depending on demand.

Service

Routeing

References

External links
22655 Thiruvananthapuram Hazrat Nizamuddin Superfast Express at India Rail Info
22656 Hazrat Nizamuddin Thiruvananthapuram Superfast Express at India Rail Info

Transport in Delhi
Transport in Thiruvananthapuram
Express trains in India
Rail transport in Kerala
Rail transport in Karnataka
Rail transport in Goa
Rail transport in Maharashtra
Rail transport in Gujarat
Rail transport in Rajasthan
Rail transport in Delhi
Railway services introduced in 2014
Rail transport in Madhya Pradesh
Rail transport in Haryana